The Doce River (Portuguese, Rio Doce) is a river of Goiás state in central Brazil. It is a tributary of the Claro River, one of the upper tributaries of the Paraná River.

See also
 List of rivers of Goiás
 Tributaries of the Río de la Plata

References

Brazilian Ministry of Transport

Rivers of Goiás